James Richard Parmer (April 25, 1927 – April 20, 2005) was an American football running back in the National Football League who played for nine seasons for the Philadelphia Eagles. He later worked as a scout.

Parmer served as an assistant coach for the Texas Tech Red Raiders football team under DeWitt Weaver during the 1960 season.

During the fourth episode of Hard Knocks, team General Manager Jeff Ireland revealed that Parmer was his grandfather.

References

External links
Parmer helped build '85 Bears

1927 births
2005 deaths
Players of American football from Dallas
American football fullbacks
American football halfbacks
Texas A&M Aggies football players
Oklahoma State Cowboys football players
Texas Tech Red Raiders football coaches
Philadelphia Eagles players